The government of Portland, Oregon is based on a city commission government system. Elected officials include the mayor, commissioners, and a city auditor. The mayor and commissioners (members of City Council) are responsible for legislative policy and oversee the various bureaus that oversee the day-to-day operation of the city.  Portland began using a commission form of government in 1913 following a public vote on May 3 of that year. Each elected official serves a four-year term, without term limits. Each city council member is elected at-large. In 2022, Portland residents approved a ballot measure to replace the commission form of government with a 12-member council elected in four districts using single transferable vote, with a professional city manager appointed by a directly-elected mayor, with the first elections to be held in 2024.

Current members

History
The Portland Charter was the subject of much debate circa 1911–1912. Rival charters were drafted by four different groups, including the "official charter committee," appointed by the mayor; the "people's charter committee," constituted under the auspices of the East Side Business Men's Club; another citizen's committee which drafted the Short Charter; and the "people's committee," led by W.C. Benbow, which drafted the Benbow Charter. The Short Charter was unusual in that it would have used Bucklin voting to elect the mayor and implemented interactive representation of the people through the commissioner system; each commissioner's vote would have been weighted according to the number of votes he received in the election. The city council appointed a committee to draft a compromise charter. This charter, along with the Short Charter, were defeated in referendums. The following year, the city council submitted another charter to the people, which was accepted. The city commission government form consequently came into use in 1913, with H. Russell Albee being the first mayor under the new system.

2022 Charter Reform 
Ballot Measure 26-228 in the November 2022 election was an amendment to the city charter that moved the city away from a commission system of government. It expands the council from four at-large council members to 12 councilors, who will be elected via ranked choice voting from four geographic districts (with three council members from each district). The mayor will no longer be a voting member of the council, except when needed to make a tie-breaking vote. It also removes responsibility for direct management of city bureaus from commissioners to a city manager overseen by the mayor and confirmed by the council. Previous attempts to reform the city charter had been defeated seven times since 1913, including as recently as 2007. 

The first city council elections under the new districts will occur in 2024. In preparation for transitioning management of city bureaus to a city manager, Mayor Ted Wheeler announced he would group city bureaus into five related service areas.

City Council

Weekly Meetings 
The City Council convenes on Wednesday mornings and Wednesday afternoons in the council chamber on the second floor of Portland City Hall, and meetings are open to the public.

Composition (since 1971)

Terms are staggered, with the mayor and the commissioners in positions 1 and 4 elected in the same years as presidential elections, and the auditor and the commissioners in positions 2 and 3 elected in the same years as gubernatorial elections.

Notable former commissioners

 Neil Goldschmidt, who went on to serve as Mayor, U.S. Secretary of Transportation, and Governor.
 Mildred Schwab
 Congressman Earl Blumenauer served on the Council before his election to the House.
 Mike Lindberg – member of council for 17 years (1979–1996), a longer tenure than any other commissioner in the 40-year period up to 2009 (and until surpassed in 2016)
 Gretchen Kafoury
 Charlie Hales – on the council 1993–2002 and againthis time as mayorfrom January 2013 through 2016
 Jim Francesconi
 Dan Saltzman – member of council for 20 years (January 1999 – December 2018), longer than any person since 1969

Elections
City Council seats, as well as the city auditor, are non-partisan, elected positions; each carries a four-year term. As with all non-partisan positions in Oregon, candidates face off in a primary election (typically in May of even-numbered years); if no candidate wins more than 50% of the vote, the top two finishers face off in a runoff election (typically the following November.) Three Council seats, including the mayor, were up for election in 2008; the other two seats, and the Auditor position, were up for election in 2010.

From 2006 to 2010, Portland used a publicly financed election system, allowing candidates to qualify for public funding of $145,000 if they could gather 1000 five-dollar contributions by a certain date (for Mayoral candidates, 1500 contributions of $5 were required for a $160,000 grant). Two candidates availed themselves of this system in 2006: incumbent Erik Sten, who won the primary election, and Amanda Fritz, who lost out to incumbent Dan Saltzman but won a seat two years later (utilizing publicly financed election money). The November 2010 elections saw Portlanders rescind their support for this publicly financed election system.

Neighborhood government 
Portland's neighborhood system, the Office of Community and Civic Life, is made up of 94 recognized neighborhood associations and seven neighborhood district coalition offices located throughout the city. These offices provide support and technical assistance to the volunteer-based neighborhood associations, community groups and individual activists.

City bureaus and services

Emergency services 
The Portland Police Bureau is the primary policing agency in the city and currently reports to the mayor, while Portland Fire & Rescue is assigned to a separate commissioner (Rene Gonzalez as of 2023). The city also has an office of emergency management planning for mitigation of natural and manmade disasters.

Utilities and energy infrastructure 
Portland Water Bureau manages municipal water services through the city, while the Bureau of Environmental Services (BES) manages sewer and stormwater systems. Waste collection and recycling is managed by the Bureau of Planning and Sustainability, which also runs the Portland Clean Energy Community Benefits Fund investing in renewable energy development.

Transportation 

Public transit within the city is primarily the responsibility of TriMet, not the city government, but the Portland Streetcar and Portland Aerial Tram are exceptions; both are owned by the city. The aerial tram is managed by Oregon Health & Science University (OHSU)

Education 
Portland Public Schools operates more than 81 schools and is one of the largest pre-kindergarten through high school districts in the state. As of 2022, Portland also provides tax-payer funded universal preschool, after voters approved a city measure in 2020.

Housing, camping and homelessness 
The city runs a number of bureaus focused on housing, development, and programs to address homelessness. The Portland Housing Bureau manages programs aimed at increasing affordable housing.

Joint Office of Homeless Services 

Since 2016, Multnomah County chair Deborah Kafoury and Portland mayor Ted Wheeler have paired the city and county together to the Joint Office of Homeless Services. In September 2020, frustrated with tents downtown, Mayor Wheeler expressed the intent to withdraw the City of Portland from its partnership with county on JOHS. The intergovernmental agreement between the city and county on the JOHS has an expense of $32.5 million to the Portland City Government and expires in June 2022. Partially using federal funds from the American Rescue Plan Act of 2021, the Joint Office of Homeless Services uses city-owned land to site Safe Rest Villages, which are managed temporary housing that augments the homeless shelter system.

Controversy over illegal-camp cleanups 

Multiple news outlet reported on the city auditor's report on the city's handling of illegal campsite clean ups by the Homelessness/Urban Camping Impact Reduction Program. Since 2015, the City of Portland implemented a streamlined campsite complaint intake. City contractors then removed tents, items and other items and stored them. The database was to prioritize cleanup based on "biohazards, garbage and other factors, such as whether campers are aggressive or openly using drugs". The Oregonian summarized that the auditors found little evidence prioritization was occurring and no clear indication of what criteria were invoked in selecting which camps are to be removed or not removed and auditors documented the city often ignored hundreds of complaints made by residents. The newspaper commented "That non-response doesn’t comport with the crackdown on illegal camping instituted by Mayor Ted Wheeler earlier in his term." The audit conducted in summer and fall of 2018 reported that the city needed to improve communications to illegal campers as well as complainants. The auditor recommends providing complainants with a status update. In 2019, the city announced they intend to do that with a new app that helps people "better record and understand HUCIRP" As of June 2020, the status update for reporting party has yet to be implemented per city's own status update.

Parks and recreation 

Portland Parks & Recreation manages 11,760 acres of public park lands in the city, including large natural areas like Forest Park and public recreation facilities such as municipal playgrounds, pools, golf courses, and the Portland International Raceway.

Related government entities
Portland is the county seat of Multnomah County, and the core of Metro, a regional government primarily concerned with land use planning. Both of these government entities have a strong impact on Portland policy.

See also
 Portland City Hall (Oregon)

References

 List of notable Commissioners from Willamette Weeks 25th Anniversary issue (1999)

External links
 City Government Structure at City of Portland website
 Official Web Site for the City of Portland, Oregon

 
Politics of Oregon
City councils in the United States
1851 establishments in Oregon Territory